Marie Adelaide Elizabeth Rayner Lowndes (née Belloc; 5 August 1868 – 14 November 1947), who wrote as Marie Belloc Lowndes, was a prolific English novelist, and sister of author Hilaire Belloc.

Active from 1898 until her death, she had a literary reputation for combining exciting incidents with psychological interest. Four of her works were adapted for the screen: The Chink in the Armour (1912; adapted 1922), The Lodger (1913; adapted several times), Letty Lynton (1931; adapted 1932), and The Story of Ivy (1927; adapted 1947).  The Lodger was also adapted as a 1940 radio drama and 1960 opera.

Personal life

Born in Marylebone, London and raised in La Celle-Saint-Cloud, France, Belloc was the only daughter of French barrister Louis Belloc and English feminist Bessie Parkes. Her younger brother was Hilaire Belloc, whom she wrote of in her last work, The Young Hilaire Belloc (published posthumously in 1956). 

Belloc's paternal grandfather was the French painter Jean-Hilaire Belloc, and her maternal great-great-grandfather was the theologian/philosopher Joseph Priestley. Her mother died in 1925, 53 years after her father.

In 1896, Belloc married Frederick Sawrey A. Lowndes (1868–1940).

Career
She published a biography, H.R.H. The Prince of Wales: An Account of His Career, in 1898. From then on novels, reminiscences and plays appeared at the rate of one per year until 1946.  She produced over forty novels in all - mainly mysteries, well-plotted and on occasion based on real-life crime, though she herself resented being classed as a crime writer. She created the French detective Hercules Popeau, roughly contemporaneously to Agatha Christie's creation of Belgian detective Hercule Poirot.

Her mother died in 1925, fifty-three years after her father. In the memoir, I, too, Have Lived in Arcadia, published in 1942, she told the story of her mother's life, compiled largely from old family letters and her own memories of her early life in France. A second autobiography Where love and friendship dwelt appeared posthumously in 1948.

Ernest Hemingway praised her insight into female psychology, revealed above all in the situation of the ordinary mind failing to cope with the impact of the extraordinary.

Death
Belloc died 14 November 1947 at the home of her elder daughter, the Countess Iddesleigh (wife of the third Earl) in Eversley Cross, Hampshire, and was interred in France, in La Celle-Saint-Cloud near Versailles, where she had spent her youth.

Adaptations

Film
Her most famous novel, The Lodger (1913), based on the Jack the Ripper murders of 1888, has been adapted for the screen several times; the first movie version was Alfred Hitchcock's silent film The Lodger: A Story of the London Fog (1927). The second film version was  Maurice Elvey's (1932), followed by John Brahm's (1944), Man in the Attic (1953), and David Ondaatje's (2009).
Her novel Letty Lynton (1931) was the basis for the 1932 motion picture of the same name starring Joan Crawford.
Her novel The Story of Ivy (1927) was adapted into the film Ivy (1947) starring Joan Fontaine.

Opera
The Lodger (opera) is a 1960 opera by Phyllis Tate, based on the 1913 novel

Radio
Hitchcock was also associated with a radio adaptation for CBS in 1940 that served as the first episode of the radio drama series, Suspense.
A further radio version was produced by the BBC in 2003

Bibliography

Non-fiction books
H.R.H. The Prince of Wales: an account of his career. New York & London (1898 as Anon, rev. 1901 as His Most Gracious Majesty King Edward VII’’)The Philosophy of the Marquise (1899)
’’Bohemia and Bourgeoisia’’ (1900)
’’The Life of Queen Alexandra’’ (1901)T.R.H. The Prince and Princess of Wales (1902, as Anon.)Noted Murder Mysteries (1914, as by 'Philip Curtin': 1916, as by Mrs Belloc Lowndes)Told in Gallant Deeds: A Child's History of the War'' (1914)
’’Real Stories of Crime & Mystery’’ (1919, as by ‘Philip Curtin’)

Fiction

See also

References

External links 

 Marie Belloc Lowndes Papers at the Harry Ransom Center
 
 
 
 
 
 
 

1868 births
1947 deaths
People from Marylebone
20th-century English novelists
20th-century English women writers
English women novelists
English people of French descent
Writers from London
Marie
Parkes family
Priestley family
People from Yvelines